Wolfgang "Wolle" Petry (born 22 September 1951 as Franz Hubert Wolfgang Remling) is a German schlager musician and songwriter from Cologne, Germany. In 1997, he was named the leading German language musician in terms of chart figures for the year, with his most successful album Alles.

He won the award for "Best Folk/Pop Artist" National/International" during the Echo awards in 1997, 1998, 1999, 2000 and 2001. He also won the Goldene Stimmgabel award in 1996, 1997, 1999, 2000, 2001, 2002, 2003 and 2005 for Most successful German solo pop act. In 1998 and 2006 he also won the "Platinum Life Award" during the same Goldene Stimmgabel awards.

In late 2017, he announced a name change to Pete Wolf. He released the album Happy Man under this moniker on 27 October, with his musical genre shifted towards country and lyrics in English language.

Personal life 
Petry was born in the Cologne neighborhood of Raderthal and grew up there. After his father's death at age 16, he assumed responsibility for his 11-year-old brother. He obtained a vocational degree in precision mechanics while touring with his band in Cologne and surroundings. He married Rosemarie Remling in 1972 and had a son, Achim Petry, two years later. Achim has re-recorded or made new editions of some of his father's songs.

Discography

Albums
 1976 – Ein Freund – Ein Mann (A Friend, a Man)
 1979 – Zweisaitig (two-sided/two-stringed)
 1980 – Ganz oder gar nicht (All or Nothing)
 1981 – Einfach leben (Easy Living)
 1982 – Der Himmel brennt (The Sky is Burning)
 1983 – Wahnsinn (Madness)
 1984 – Rauhe Wege (Rough Paths)
 1987 – Mit offenen Armen (With Open Arms)
 1988 – Manche mögen’s heiß (Some Like it Hot)
 1991 – Wo ist das Problem? (What's the Problem?)
 1992 – Verlieben, verloren, vergessen, verzeih’n (Falling in Love, Lost, Forgot, Forgive)
 1992 – Meine größten Erfolge (My Greatest Hits)
 1993 – Sehnsucht nach dir (Longing for You)
 1994 – Frei für dich (Free for You)
 1995 – Egal (Whatever)
 1996 – Alles (Everything)
 1996 – Die längste Single der Welt – Teil 1 (The Longest Single on Earth - Part 1)
 1996 – Gnadenlos (Merciless)
 1997 – Du bist ein Wunder (You're a Miracle)
 1997 – Nie genug (Never Enough)
 1998 – Freude! (Joy!)
 1998 – Einfach geil! (Simply Cool!)
 1999 – Die längste Single der Welt – Teil 2 (The Longest Single on Earth - Part 2)
 1999 – Alles – Live (Everything - Live)
 1999 – Komplett (Completely)
 2000 – Konkret (Concretely)
 2000 – Freude 2 (Joy 2)
 2001 – Achterbahn (Rollercoaster)
 2001 – Die längste Single der Welt – Teil 3 (The Longest Single on Earth - Part 3)
 2002 – Alles 2 (Everything 2)
 2003 – Kein Grund zur Panik (No reason for Panic)
 2003 – Freudige Weihnachten (Jolly Christmas)
 2004 – Typisch (Typical)
 2004 – Nur für dich (Just for You)
 2005 – ... Doppelt stark!!! (Doppel CD) (...Double Strong!!!)
 2005 – Die längste Single der Welt – Das Album (Teil 4) (The Longest Single on Earth - Part 4)
 2005 – Ich bin ene kölsche Jung (I'm a Boy from Cologne)
 2006 – Meine Lieblingslieder (My Favourite Songs)
 2006 – 30 (Abschiedsalbum) (30 - Farewell Album)
 2007 – Seine schönsten Balladen (mit 2 unveröffentlichten Titeln) (His Most Beautiful Ballads; with 2 unreleased tracks)
 2007 – Das letzte Konzert – LIVE – einfach geil! (The Last Concert - LIVE - Simply Cool)
 2008 – Alles Maxi – Seine größten Erfolge (Everything Maxi - His Greatest Hits)
 2014 – Einmal noch! (Once More!)
 2014 – Wolles fröhliche Weihnachten (Wolle's Merry Christmas)
 2015 – Brandneu (Brand-New)
 2016 – Die Jahre mit dir (The Years with You)
 2017 – Happy Man (as Pete Wolf Band)
 2018 – Genau jetzt! (Right now!)
 2019 – 2084 (as Pete Wolf Band)
 2021 – Auf das Leben (Here's to Life)
 2023 – Stark wie wir (Strong like us)

References

External links 
 
 
 

German-language singers
German male musicians
Musicians from Cologne
Schlager musicians
1951 births
Living people